Ballywiheen is a medieval Christian site and National Monument located on the Dingle Peninsula, Ireland.

Location

Ballywiheen is located 800 m (half a mile) south of Ballyferriter, on the south side of Croaghmarhin mountain.

History

There was an early Christian settlement here, also called Raingiléis.

The Ogham stone was erected as a grave marker c. AD 500–550. In the 1880s it was broken open in search of gold.

Excavations in 1998 turned up a stone lamp and flint scraper.

Description

Ballywiheen is surrounded by an enclosure  in diameter. In the eastern part are the remains of an early drystone oratory. To the west are two mounds — these mark the location of two leachtaí (stone altars).

There is also a cross slab (decorated with Maltese cross), grave mounds (suggestive of a calluragh burial ground).

There is also a stone cross 123 cm (four feet) in height.

Cathair na gCat

The name Cathair na gCat means "the cat's stone fort" (the "cat" referred to is possibly the "tree cat", i.e. the pine marten.) This is a stone fort (cashel) located immediately south of Ballywiheen Christian site. It contains two stone huts and a possible souterrain.

The Ogham stone (dated to the early 6th century AD) reads TOGITTACC MAQI SAGARET[TOS], "of Toicthech son of Sáraid."

References

Christian monasteries in the Republic of Ireland
Religion in County Kerry
Archaeological sites in County Kerry
National Monuments in County Kerry